N.B.: Trade unions may be invariably described as pressure groups; these organisations should be mentioned at the list of trade unions in the United Kingdom article, not here.

There are many pressure groups around the world. This is a list of pressure groups in the United Kingdom. Based on their relationship with United Kingdom policy makers, they can be divided into insider groups, who have high degree of involvement and influence and outsider groups, who have little or no direct involvement or influence.

Cause
Cause, promotional or attitude groups aim to change opinions and attitudes.

Liberty
Survival International

LGBT+ rights

Albany Trust
Educational Action Challenging Homophobia
Families and Friends of Lesbians and Gays
Lesbians Against Pit Closures (defunct)
Lesbians and Gays Support the Miners (defunct)
LGBT Foundation
LGBT Humanists UK
National Union of Students LGBT+ Campaign
OneBodyOneFaith
OutRage! (defunct)
Stonewall
 
Political LGBT groups
LGBT+ Conservatives
LGBT+ Labour
LGBT+ Liberal Democrats
LGBTIQA+ Greens
Out for Independence (the Scottish National Party's LGBT wing)
Plaid Pride (Plaid Cymru's LGBT wing)
Rainbow Greens (the Scottish Greens LGBT wing)
 
Transgender rights
 
For:
Action for Trans Health
All About Trans
Labour Campaign for Trans Rights
Mermaids (charity)
Press for Change
The Gender Trust
Trans Media Watch
 
Against:
For Women Scotland
LGB Alliance
Safe Schools Alliance
Transgender Trend
Woman's Place UK

Animal welfare and animal rights
British Union for the Abolition of Vivisection
Humanitarian League (1891–1919)
Hunt Saboteurs Association
League Against Cruel Sports
OneKind
Royal Society for the Prevention of Cruelty to Animals
Vegetarians' International Voice for Animals

Business
Association of British Insurers (ABI)
British Bankers' Association (BA)
British Chambers of Commerce (BCC)
Confederation of British Industry (CBI)
Corporate Watch
Federation of Small Businesses (FSB)
TheCityUK
Mediawatch-uk
London First

Cultural
British Deaf Association
British Stammering Association
British Croup Association
City Sikhs
Countryside Alliance
Saddleworth White Rose Society
Welsh Language Society
Yorkshire Ridings Society

Drugs
 Beckley Foundation
 CLEAR (Cannabis Law Reform)
 Drug Equality Alliance (DEA)
 NORML UK (Cannabis legislation reform)
 Transform Drug Policy Foundation

Environmental
Camp for Climate Action
Campaign for the Protection of Rural Wales
Campaign to Protect Rural England
Extinction Rebellion
Forum for the Future
Friends of the Earth (England, Wales and Northern Ireland)
Friends of the Earth Scotland
Greenpeace
Insulate Britain
Just Stop Oil
 Plane Stupid
 Population Matters
 Sandbag
 The Soil Association
Surfers Against Sewage
Royal Society for the Protection of Birds (RSPB)
Waste Watch
 World Wildlife Fund for Nature (WWF)

Family relationships
Fathers' rights movement in the UK
Families Need Fathers
Fathers 4 Justice
New Fathers 4 Justice
Mothers Apart from Their Children
National Society for the Prevention of Cruelty to Children (NSPCC)

Abortion rights
For:
British Pregnancy Advisory Service
MSI Reproductive Choices
Family Planning Association
Abortion Rights
Abortion Support Network
Against:
LIFE
Society for the Protection of Unborn Children
UK Life League

Food
Campaign for Real Ale (CAMRA)
The Food Commission

Human rights
Amnesty International
Children's Rights Alliance for England (CRAE)
JUSTICE
Liberty
Survival International

International development
Amnesty International
Christian Aid
Global Justice Now (formerly World Development Movement)
Oxfam
People & Planet
Stop AIDS Campaign
World Development Movement

Political
38 Degrees
Article 19
Association of British Commuters
Campaign Against Arms Trade
Campaign Against Censorship
Campaign for Freedom of Information
Campaign for Nuclear Disarmament
Campaign for Press and Broadcasting Freedom
Campaign to Bring Back British Rail
Celtic League
Charter 88 (merged with the New Politics Network to form Unlock Democracy in 2007)
Electoral Reform Society
English Defence League
Feminists Against Censorship
The Freedom Association
Labour Representation Committee
League for Democracy in Greece (defunct)
Make Votes Matter
MigrationWatch UK
National Campaign Against Fees and Cuts
NO2ID
Republic
Social Liberal Forum
Society for Individual Freedom
Stop the War Coalition
TaxPayers' Alliance
Voice of the Listener & Viewer

British EU-based pressure groups

Business for Britain
Britain in Europe
Britain Stronger in Europe
British Influence
Business for New Europe
Campaign for an Independent Britain
Conservatives for Britain
Democracy Movement
European Movement
Grassroots Out (GO)
Nucleus
Labour for a Referendum
Labour In for Britain
Labour Leave
Leave Means Leave
Leave.EU
Unite to Remain
Vote Leave

Population
Population Matters

Public health

Smoking and tobacco use 
Action on Smoking and Health (ASH) – registered charity in the UK, influential in lobbying for and implementing the English smoking ban
Freedom Organisation for the Right to Enjoy Smoking Tobacco (FOREST)

Anti-vaccination 
JABS (Justice, Awareness and Basic Support) – a vaccine-hesitant group involved in Andrew Wakefield's fraudulent 1998 study alleging a link between the MMR vaccine and autism in children, a claim the group still promotes.

Religious/secular groups
Christian Institute
Humanists UK
Muslim Council of Britain
National Secular Society

Rural matters
 Rural Services Network (RSN)
 Rural Services Partnership (RSP)
 Rural England CIC
 Countryside Alliance

Transport
Alliance of British Drivers
Association of British Commuters
Campaign for Better Transport
Campaign to Bring Back British Rail
Campaign to Electrify Britain's Railways
Confederation of Passenger Transport
Cycling UK
Slower Speeds Initiative

Women
The Fawcett Society
The National Union of Women's Suffrage Societies (known as "suffragists"; defunct)
The Women's Social and Political Union (known as "suffragettes"; defunct)

Youth
 UK Youth

See also
Politics of the United Kingdom

 
Pressure groups